Scrapyard Dog is a scrolling platform game published by Atari Corporation for the Atari 7800 in 1990, followed by an Atari Lynx port in 1991.

Plot 

The player controls Louie whose dog, Scraps, was kidnapped by Mr. Big. The object of the game is to rescue Scraps through various stages.

Gameplay 

The Atari 7800 version has 17 stages while the Atari Lynx has 33.

Development and release

Reception 

Robert Jung reviewed the Atari Lynx version of the game which was published to IGN. He wrote that, "Despite the cute graphics and the simple plot, this title offers good clean fun for players of all ages" and gave an 8 out of 10 score.

Atari 7800 Forever retrospectively scored the game 3.5 out of 5, identifying with the urban blighted world and praising the amount of unique surprises in the game, yet admonishing the extremely difficult jumps that feel cheap.

References

External links 
 Scrapyard Dog at AtariAge
 Scrapyard Dog at GameFAQs
 Scrapyard Dog at Giant Bomb

1990 video games
Atari games
Atari 7800 games
Atari Lynx games
BlueSky Software games
Side-scrolling platform games
Single-player video games
Video games about dogs
Video games developed in the United States